The annual PGA Tour Qualifying Tournament, also known as Qualifying School or Q-School, was historically the main method by which golfers earned PGA Tour playing privileges, commonly known as a Tour card. Beginning in 2013, Q-School grants privileges only for the Korn Ferry Tour, the PGA Tour's official developmental circuit.

History 
At the PGA of America's annual meeting in 1963 Earl Stewart, a club professional from Dallas, first brought up the idea of having a qualifying school. Two years later at the inaugural q-school he explained to the press on the purpose of the event. "It is designed to take the burden of making a judgement on a proposed player's talent away from the local level," he said. "Formerly the various sections were responsible for screening and qualifying a man for the tour, but all they do now is screen and recommend for the new qualifying tournament."

In several early years (1968–69, 1975–81), two separate tournaments were played, one in the spring and one in the fall. The format of the tournament has changed several times, ranging from a 72-hole tournament to a 144-hole tournament. The current format (in place since 1982) is 108 holes over six days in late November and early December. Before 2013, the top 25 players and ties earned their tour cards. The next set of fifty finishers earned full Korn Ferry Tour cards. The remaining participants received conditional Korn Ferry Tour status.

The 2012 Qualifying Tournament was the last to grant playing privileges for the PGA Tour. On March 20, 2012, the tour announced radical changes to its season structure and qualifying process, and announced further details on July 10 of that year.

The 2013 season ended with The Tour Championship in September, and the 2014 season began the following month. Since then, the Qualifying Tournament only grants playing privileges for the Korn Ferry Tour (known as the Nationwide Tour at the time of the March 2012 announcement). A new series of three tournaments known as the Korn Ferry Tour Finals, held in September, grants 50 PGA Tour cards to a field consisting of the top 75 on the Korn Ferry Tour money list and the golfers placed 126 to 200 on the PGA Tour's FedEx Cup points list. The top 25 on the Korn Ferry Tour money list before the Finals receive PGA Tour cards, with total money earned in the Finals determining the remaining 25 card earners.

Medalists

References

External links

 
PGA Tour events